Humnyska is a village (selo) in Zolochiv Raion, Lviv Oblast of Western Ukraine. It belongs to Busk urban hromada, one of the hromadas of Ukraine.
Local government is administered by Humnyska village council.
A village Chuchmany is also in the structure of local government.

Geography 
The village is located near  the highway in European route E40  connecting Lviv with Kyiv.

History and Culture 
Village Humnyska, probably founded in the fifteenth century, has a record of where it was first mentioned in 1476.
Traces of Stone Age settlements (3rd millennium BC) and early Bronze Age archaeological excavations have been revealed near the village Chuchmany and Humnyska.
From 1772 the village was a part of Austrian Empire, since 1867 as part of Austro-Hungarian Empire. From 1920 to 1939 Humnyska was part of Second Polish Republic. 
In 1931 in the village was built school. The first director was Stepan Kalynevych. He led the school until 1945 and made a significant contribution to the development of education in rural areas.

Until 18 July 2020, Humnyska belonged to Busk Raion. The raion was abolished in July 2020 as part of the administrative reform of Ukraine, which reduced the number of raions of Lviv Oblast to seven. The area of Busk Raion was merged into Zolochiv Raion.

Cult constructions and religion 

The first church building was built of wood in 1724. The new building was built and consecrated November 21, 1926, and it survived to the present day. This is the Church of St. Michael the Archangel. The Church is in the list of wooden churches Lviv region.
In 1838 Markiyan Shashkevych was a priest in the Church of St. Michael the Archangel.

Famous people 
 Markiyan Shashkevych – was a priest of the Ukrainian Greek-Catholic Church, a poet, a translator, and the leader of the literary revival in Right Bank Ukraine. In 1838 Markiyan Shashkevych was a priest in the Church of St. Michael the Archangel in the village Humnyska.
 Yulian Voronovskyi – was the Eparchial bishop of Ukrainian Catholic Eparchy of Sambir – Drohobych since March 30, 1994 to October 27, 2011. (born May 5, 1936 in Humnyska).
 Stepan Kalynevych – the school director from 1931 until 1945 in Humnyska.

References

External links 
 village Humnyska
 Гумниська, Церква Св. Арх. Михайла 1926 
 weather.in.ua

Literature 
 Історія міст і сіл УРСР : Львівська область, Тершів. – К. : ГРУРЕ, 1968 р. Page 203 
 М. Арендач. Село Плав'є: погляд крізь віки. Львів: Ініціатива, 2012–176с. Редактор Ігор Дах. (V.6. Культурний розвиток, стор. 120) 

Villages in Zolochiv Raion, Lviv Oblast